Valdemar Ingemann (21 February 1840 – 10 October 1911) was a prolific Danish architect active during the late 19th and early 20th century. His works include the Royal Copenhagen Porcelain Manufactury (now Porcelænshaven) in Frederiksberg, Copenhagen.

Early life and career
Valdemar Ingemann was born in Copenhagen, the son of merchant and perfume manufacturer Søren Edvard Joachim Ingemann, nephew of the author Bernhard Severin Ingemann, and Mariane Aurelia Laurentine née Lauritzen.  He completed a mason's apprenticeship and was prior to that, in October 1856, admitted to the Royal Danish Academy of Fine Arts where he won the large silver medal (1863) before graduating in 1866.

Career
Ingemann then worked as a draughtsman for H. C. Stilling and Johan Henrik Nebelong before setting up his own practice. He taught at the Technical Society's School from 1877 to 1900. Ingemann also served on the Copenhagen City Council from 1894 to 1900.

Selected works
 Chapel, Assistens Cemetery, Copenhagen (1867–1868)
 Store Søvang, Køge (1874)
 Østifternes Kreditforening,, Nørre Voldgade, Copenhagen (1875)
 Luthersk Mission, Nansensgade, Copenhagen (1876)
 Aluminia later also Royal Copenhagen, now Porcelænshaven, Smallegade, Copenhagen (1882)
 Købmagergade 50, Købmagergade, Copenhagen (1884)
 Frederiksholms Kanal 4 (for Kunstforeningen), Frederiksholms Kanal, Copenhagen (1886)
 Købmagergade 44, Købmagergade, Copenhagen (1888)
 Frederiksborggade 1 (corner of Kultorvet), Copenhagen (1895, spire dismantled)
 Krabbesholm (rebuilding), Gershøj (1905)

In collaboration with Bernhard Ingemann 
 S. Seidelin Building (now Pressens Hus), Skindergade, Copenhagen (1901)
 , Fiolstræde 44, Copenhagen (1901–1902)
 Lyngby Søndre Mølle, Kongens Lyngby (1903)
 County hospital, Nykøbing Sjælland (1911)
 , Bragesgade 26 B, Copenhagen (1909–1910)
 Nørregade 4-6, Copenhagen (1907)
 Skindergade 7, Copenhagen

Image gallery

References

External links

 Valdemar Ingemann on Kunstindeks Danmark

19th-century Danish architects
19th-century Copenhagen City Council members
Architects from Copenhagen
1840 births
1911 deaths